is a retired Japanese sprinter who specialized in the 400 metres.

He won the bronze medal at the 1998 Asian Championships in a career best time of 45.69 seconds. He was then selected to represent Asia in 4 × 400 metres relay at the 1998 IAAF World Cup, and finished sixth with teammates Ibrahim Ismail Faraj, Sugath Tillakaratne and fellow Japanese sprinter Masayoshi Kan.

Tabata also competed at two World Championships (1999 and 2001) as well as the 2000 Summer Olympics where he failed to reach the final round.

International competition

1Competed only in the heat.

National titles
Japanese Championships
400 m: 1998, 2002

References

External links

Kenji Tabata at JAAF  (archived)
Kenji Tabata at JOC 
Kenji Tabata at Mizuno  (archived)

1974 births
Living people
Sportspeople from Aichi Prefecture
Japanese male sprinters
Olympic male sprinters
Olympic athletes of Japan
Athletes (track and field) at the 1996 Summer Olympics
Athletes (track and field) at the 2000 Summer Olympics
Asian Games gold medalists for Japan
Asian Games medalists in athletics (track and field)
Athletes (track and field) at the 1998 Asian Games
Athletes (track and field) at the 2002 Asian Games
Medalists at the 1998 Asian Games
Competitors at the 1995 Summer Universiade
World Athletics Championships athletes for Japan
Japan Championships in Athletics winners
20th-century Japanese people